The Kennedy Institute of Ethics Journal is a quarterly academic journal established in 1991. It is published by the Johns Hopkins University Press on behalf of the Kennedy Institute of Ethics and focuses on questions of bioethics such as those relating to the research of and therapeutic use of human embryonic stem cells, organ donation, and genetic manipulation, as well as issues of global justice, research in the developing world, environmental ethics, food ethics, and issues of governance and expertise in clinical research.

The current Editor-in-Chief is Quill Kukla.

According to the Journal Citation Reports, the journal has a 2015 impact factor of 1.129, ranking it 22nd out of 51 journals in the category "Ethics".

See also 
 List of ethics journals

References

External links 
 

Bioethics journals
Ethics literature
Georgetown University academic journals
English-language journals
Johns Hopkins University Press academic journals
Quarterly journals
Publications established in 1991
1991 establishments in the United States